H. L. Verma is an Indian educational administrator. He is President (Vice-Chancellor), at Jagannath University, Jaipur.

Career
He previously worked as Vice-Chancellor in Jagan Nath University, NCR. Bahadurgarh, Haryana as Pro Vice-Chancellor (2000-2003), in Guru Jambheshwar University of Science and Technology as Professor & Dean of Management (1996-2013) and Pro- Vice Chancellor(2013-2014), in Apeejay Satya University as a Reader & Head, Department of Commerce  Maharshi Dayanand University (1988–96) at Regional Center Rewari now Indira Gandhi University, Meerpur, Rewari.

He was a lecturer in the Department of Commerce Kurukshetra University (1984–88) and served as a lecturer in degree colleges from 1976 to 1984. He authored 12 books and published 63 research papers.

He was born in Sandaur in District Sangrur, Punjab. H. L. Verma is also known as Harbans Lal Verma.

Research 
He completed his Ph.D. in 1988 on the "Management of working capital in iron and steel industry in India" under the guidance of B.S. Bhatia. His first book came in 1989 named,  Management  of  Working  Capital.
He supervised 30 research scholars for their Ph.D. degrees.

Books
 
 Vol.1.   Understanding HRD – Basic Concepts
 Vol.2.   Dimensions of HRD – Role and Orientation.
 Vol.3.   HRD Practices in India – Assimilation and Implications.
 
  
 
 
 - in Two Volumes (1994).
 –  in Five Volumes (1994).
 Vol. 1.  Metaphysics of Cooperative Movement.
 Vol. 2.  Cooperatives and Rural Development – Re-energizing Rural Frontiers.
 Vol. 3.  Cooperative Banking - Levers of Rural Economy.
 Vol. 4. Cooperative Marketing – Prolitarianisation of Distributory Channels.
 Vol. 5.  Cooperatives and Manpower Development – Tapping Human Resources.

References

External links

 

1953 births
Living people
People from Sangrur
Punjabi University alumni
Academic staff of Kurukshetra University
Academic staff of Jagannath University
Academic staff of Maharshi Dayanand University
Heads of universities and colleges in India
20th-century Indian educational theorists
21st-century Indian educational theorists
20th-century Indian educators
21st-century Indian educators